Don Wix (born May 14, 1946, in Carrollton, Georgia) was a member of the Georgia General Assembly in the U.S. state of Georgia.  Wix is a Democrat who represented District 33, which encompasses parts of southern Cobb County, from 1997 to 2010.

Wix graduated from the University of Georgia in Athens in 1968 with a BBA degree. He is the son of Reverend J. Edwin Wix, longtime pastor of Austell's Mt. Pisgah Baptist Church, and Mrs. Trumie Paris Wix, a teacher in Cobb County and Paulding County schools, both of whom are deceased.

References

Living people
People from Austell, Georgia
University of Georgia alumni
Democratic Party members of the Georgia House of Representatives
1946 births
People from Carrollton, Georgia
21st-century American politicians